Thomas P. Finlay (1897 – 6 September 1967) was an Irish hurler who played as a wing-back for the Laois senior team.

Regarded as one of Laois's greatest-ever players, Finlay played during the county's most successful period from 1914 to 1915 before later lining out for Dublin. During his inter-county career he won two All-Ireland medals and three Leinster medals. Finlay was an All-Ireland runner-up on one occasion.

At club level Finlay won several county club championship medals with Ballygeehan.

His brother, Jack Finlay, was also an All-Ireland medalist with Laois.

References

1897 births
1967 deaths
Clough-Ballacolla hurlers
Kickham's hurlers
Army Metro hurlers
Laois inter-county hurlers
Dublin inter-county hurlers
All-Ireland Senior Hurling Championship winners